Franz Neumann may refer to:

Franz Neumann (architect), Austrian architect
Franz Ernst Neumann, German physicist and mathematician
Franz Leopold Neumann, German-American legal scholar and theorist